The 2006 Bayern Rundfahrt was the 27th edition of the Bayern Rundfahrt cycle race and was held on 24 May to 28 May 2006. The race started in Gunzenhausen and finished in Cham. The race was won by José Alberto Martínez.

General classification

References

Bayern-Rundfahrt
2006 in German sport